This List of mountains and hills in the Eifel contains a selection of mountains (2000 feet or higher) and hills (below 2000 feet) in the low mountain range of the Eifel which lies mainly in Germany but also crosses into Belgium. The Eifel is located predominantly in the German states of Rhineland-Palatinate and North Rhine-Westphalia and belongs to the Rhenish Massif.

See also:  List of mountains and hills in North Rhine-Westphalia and List of mountains and hills in Rhineland-Palatinate

References and footnotes

Sources 
 Whittow, John (1984). Dictionary of Physical Geography. London: Penguin, 1984. .

!
Eifel
!Eifel
!Eifel